Sir Patrick Alexander Benedict Grant, 14th Baronet (born 5 February 1953) is a Scottish businessman.

Grant is the son of Sir Duncan Grant, 13th Baronet and Joan Penelope Cope. He married Dr. Carolyn Elizabeth Highet, in 1981. He has two sons:

Duncan Archibald Ludovic Grant, Younger of Dalvey (born 19 Apr 1982)
Neil Patrick Grant (born 21 Oct 1983)

He succeeded to the title of 14th Baronet Grant, of Dalvey on 25 March 1961. He was educated in 1961 at St Conleth's College, Dublin.

He was educated at The Abbey School, Fort Augustus, Inverness-shire, Scotland. He graduated from Glasgow University, Scotland, in 1981 with a Bachelor of Law (LL.B.) He was founder and managing director of Grants of Dalvey Ltd in 1988.

References

External links
 Dalvey - Our Heritage

Living people
1953 births
Alumni of the University of Glasgow
Baronets in the Baronetage of Nova Scotia
People educated at St Conleth's College
Place of birth missing (living people)